Ri Chol-man (born in 1968) is a politician of the Democratic People's Republic of Korea (North Korea). He is a member of the Central Committee of the Workers' Party of Korea and Chairman of the Party Committee of South Hwanghae Province since April 2019.

Biography
Born in 1968. In 2005, he became Vice-Chairman of the North Pyongan Province Rural Accounting Committee and was promoted to Chairman in July 2010. 
In 2009, he was elected to the 12th convocation of the Supreme People's Assembly. In April 2013, he was appointed the Vice Premier of the Cabinet and Agriculture Minister. In May 2016 he was appointed to the WPK Agriculture Department secretary until April 2019, when he was appointed to the Secretary of the WPK South Hwanghae Provincial Committee. replacing Pak Yong-ho.

References

Living people
1968 births
Members of the Supreme People's Assembly
Agriculture ministers of North Korea
Alternate members of the 8th Politburo of the Workers' Party of Korea
Members of the 8th Central Committee of the Workers' Party of Korea